Hans Tolford (October 1, 1944 – 3 September 2013) was an Austrian painter, poet, photographer, filmmaker, author and illustrator.

Biography
Tolford was the son of the carpenter Herbert Tolford. He was raised by his father. Hans Tolfords mother, Juliane Tolford, died during the war in 1945. He was educated from Akademie der bildenden Künste (BFA), Zürcher Hochschule der Künste (MFA), Académie des Beaux-Arts (ph.d).

By the time he completed his masters education in Fine Art at the Zürcher Hochschule der Künste in 1967, he was already part of the important experimental art collective "Zü'Klingen'Rich" and was working primarily as a photographer, writer and an illustrating artist which he pursued till his death 3 September 2013.

Tolford's latest project is called "October Dance". Tolford gathered three musicians to perform and interprets his illustrations into music. He started the project in 2012. The band continued to exist after Tolfords death.

Selected exhibitions
Bankgasse Galerie, Wien, Austria - Menschen ich treffe mit Text.
Bastai für die Kunst, Wien, Austria – Melting Pictures/ Schmelz-Bildern
Kreis 4 Galerie, Zürich, Schweiz – 6 Moon
Galerie Gmurzynska, Zürich, Schweiz - Symmetrische Arbeit
Dorfstraße 7, Wangels, Germany – The machine in conducting a translating of a country’s language.

External links
 https://web.archive.org/web/20130602124203/http://hanstolford.com/
 https://web.archive.org/web/20130416050952/http://octoberdance.dk/

Austrian male sculptors
1944 births
2013 deaths
Abstract painters
Pop artists
Abstract sculptors
20th-century Austrian painters
Austrian male painters
21st-century Austrian painters
21st-century male artists
20th-century Austrian sculptors
21st-century Austrian sculptors
Academic staff of the Zurich University of the Arts
20th-century Austrian male artists